Vermont gained two seats after the 1810 Census.  Rather than re-district, however, Vermont replaced its districts with a single at-large district.  It would continue to use an at-large district in 1814, 1816, and 1818, then one more time in 1822 (with 5 seats).

Its elections were held September 1, 1812.

See also 
 United States House of Representatives elections, 1812 and 1813
 List of United States representatives from Vermont

1812
Vermont
United States House of Representatives